NK Medulin 1921 is a Croatian football club based in the town of Medulin.

External links
NK Medulin 1921 at Nogometni magazin 

Football clubs in Croatia
Football clubs in Istria County
Association football clubs established in 1921
1921 establishments in Croatia